Richard Roe may refer to:
 Richard Roe (cricketer)
 Richard Roe (clockmaker)
 Richard Roe (pseudonym)